The Sibelius Medal has been awarded by the Sibelius Society of Finland since 1965. The medal is awarded to individuals and organizations for their outstanding achievements as performers or supporters of Jean Sibelius' music. The Sibelius Medal is designed by the sculptress Eila Hiltunen.

Recipients
220 recipients were awarded from 1965 to 2015.

Selected recipients:

1965
Urho Kekkonen, No. 1
Aino Sibelius, No. 2
Herbert von Karajan, No. 3
Georg Szell
John Barbirolli
Birgit Nilsson
Eugene Ormandy
David Oistrakh
Benjamin Britten
Oleg Kagan
Emil Telmányi
Paavo Berglund
Joonas Kokkonen
1970
Okko Kamu
1977
Colin Davis
1978
Alexander Gibson
1979
Isaac Stern
1980
Henryk Szeryng
Ida Haendel
Viktoria Mullova
1981
Leonard Bernstein
1984
Vladimir Ashkenazy
1988
Gennady Rozhdestvensky
1990
Aulis Sallinen
1995
Pekka Kuusisto
1997
Glenda Goss
2005
Osmo Vänskä, chief conductor
Esa-Pekka Salonen, chief conductor
Leif Segerstam, chief conductor
2006
Izumi Tateno, pianist
2007
Jorma Hynninen, opera singer
Soile Isokoski, opera singer
Reijo Kiilunen, managing director
Jukka-Pekka Saraste, chief conductor
2008
the Sibelius Society of Hämeenlinna
2009
the Sibelius Society of Järvenpää
2010
Andrew Barnett (UK), chairman 
2011
Tom Krause, opera singer
2014
, pianist 
2015	 	
Simon Rattle, conductor
Kari Kilpeläinen, docent
Hilkka Helminen, museum director 
Paavo Järvi, conductor
Juha Kurkinen, managing director
Vesa Sirén, journalist
, conductor
Kikuo Watanabe, pianist
Markku Hartikainen, researcher

References

International music awards
Classical music awards
Jean Sibelius
Awards established in 1965
Medals
Finnish music awards